Athénée Royal d'Auderghem (ARA) is a secondary school in Brussels, Belgium, supported by the French Community of Belgium. It has three campuses:
 Section fondamentale in Auderghem
 Section secondaire Implantation Auderghem
 Implantation La Brise in Watermael-Boitsfort

References

External links
 Athénée Royal d'Auderghem 

Schools in Brussels
Secondary schools in Brussels